Wyrd is a concept in  Anglo-Saxon culture roughly corresponding to fate or personal destiny. The word is ancestral to Modern English weird, whose meaning has drifted towards an adjectival use with a more general sense of "supernatural" or "uncanny", or simply "unexpected".

The word also appears in the name of the well where the Norns meet, Urðarbrunnr.

Etymology

The Old English term  derives from a Proto-Germanic term . Wyrd has cognates in Old Saxon , Old High German , Old Norse , Dutch  (to become), and German .

 is a noun formed from the Old English verb , meaning 'to come to pass, to become'. Adjectival use of wyrd developed in the 15th century, in the sense 'having the power to control destiny', originally in the name of the Weird Sisters, i.e. the classical Fates, who in the Elizabethan period were detached from their classical background and given an English personification as fays.

The weird sisters notably appear as the Three Witches in Shakespeare's Macbeth. To elucidate this, many editors of the play include a footnote associating the "Weird Sisters" with the Old English word  or 'fate'. 

The modern English usage actually developed from the Scots dialect of English, where beginning in the 14th century, to weird was used as a verb with the sense of 'to preordain by decree of fate'. This use then gave rise to the early nineteenth century adjective meaning 'unearthly', which then developed into modern English weird.

The modern spelling weird first appeared in Scottish and Northern English dialects in the 16th century and was taken up in standard literary English starting in the 17th century. The regular form ought to have been wird, from Early Modern English werd. The replacement of werd by weird in the northern dialects is "difficult to account for".

The most common modern meaning of weird'odd, strange'is first attested in 1815, originally with a connotation of the supernatural or portentous (especially in the collocation weird and wonderful), but by the early 20th century increasingly applied to everyday situations.

Fate in Germanic mythology

According to J. Duncan Spaeth, "Wyrd (Norse Urd, one of the three Norns) is the Old English goddess of Fate, whom even Christianity could not entirely displace."

 is a feminine noun, and its Norse cognate , besides meaning 'fate', is the name of one of the deities known as Norns. For this reason,  has been interpreted by some scholars as a pre-Christian goddess of fate. In particular, some scholars argue that the three Norns are a late influence from the three Moirai in Greek and Roman mythology, who are goddesses of fate.

The names of the Norns are Urðr, Verðandi, and Skuld.  means 'that which has come to pass',  means "that which is in the process of happening" (it is the present participle of the verb cognate to  ), and  means 'debt' or 'guilt' (from a Germanic root  'to owe', also found in English should and shall).

According to Voluspa 20, the three Norns "set up the laws", "decided on the lives of the children of time" and "promulgate their ". Frigg, on the other hand, while she "knows all ørlǫg", "says it not herself" (Lokasenna 30). Lawless that is ""  occurs in Voluspa 17 in reference to driftwood, that is given breath, warmth and spirit by three gods, to create the first humans, Ask and Embla ('Ash' and possibly 'Elm' or 'Vine').

In The Wanderer,  is irrepressible and relentless. She or it "snatches the earls away from the joys of life," and "the wearied mind of man cannot withstand her" for her decrees "change all the world beneath the heavens".

Modern usage in Paganism
Like other aspects of Germanic paganism, the concept of wyrd plays a role in modern Germanic Heathenry.

Other uses

The Wyrd Mons, a mountain on Venus, is named after an "Anglo-Saxon weaving goddess". Frank Herbert used the word "weird" in his science-fiction novel Dune to connote power, e.g. a martial art is referred to as “the Weirding Way", which takes place at the speed of thought. This was modified by director David Lynch, in his 1984 film version of the book, to become a system of sonic weapons called "weirding modules."

See also

Amor fati
Beot
Destiny
Karma
Kismet
 Moirai
Predestination
Ṛta
Teotl
Weaving (mythology)

References

Bertha S. Philpotts, 'Wyrd and Providence in Anglo-Saxon Thought', Essays and Studies 13 (1928), 7-27.

Anglo-Saxon paganism
Germanic paganism
Magical terms in Germanic mysticism
Norse mythology
Destiny